Marquam is an unincorporated community in Clackamas County, Oregon, United States. It is located on Oregon Route 213, between the cities of Molalla and Silverton. Marquam was named for pioneer settler Alfred Marquam, who came to Oregon in 1845 from the east (Maryland via Missouri). In 1889 the Marquam post office was established and named for Alfred Marquam, who was also the first postmaster. His younger brother was Philip Augustus Marquam, a noted early judge in Oregon.

References

External links
Historic photos of Marquam from Salem Public Library

Portland metropolitan area
Unincorporated communities in Clackamas County, Oregon
1889 establishments in Oregon
Populated places established in 1889
Unincorporated communities in Oregon